Patrick McClung is a two-time Oscar nominated visual effects artist.

Oscar Nominations

Both are in the category of  Best Visual Effects.

67th Academy Awards-Nominated for True Lies. Nomination shared with John Bruno, Thomas L. Fisher and Jacques Stroweis. Lost to Forrest Gump.
71st Academy Awards-Nominated for Armageddon. Nomination shared with John Frazier and Richard R. Hoover. Lost to What Dreams May Come.

Selected filmography

X-Men Origins: Wolverine (2009)
Live Free or Die Hard (2007)
X-Men: The Last Stand (2006)
The Day After Tomorrow (2004)
The Tuxedo (2002)
Charlie's Angels (2000)
Armageddon (1998)
Dante's Peak (1997)
Apollo 13 (1995)
True Lies (1994)
Cliffhanger (1993)
The Abyss (1989)
Die Hard (1988)
Aliens (1986)
Ghostbusters (1984)
The Empire Strikes Back (1980)
Star Trek: The Motion Picture (1979)

References

External links

Living people
Special effects people
Year of birth missing (living people)